Richard Andrew Balfe, Baron Balfe (born 14 May 1944) is a British politician and life peer. He was a Labour Party Member of the European Parliament (MEP) from 1979 but joined the Conservative Party in 2002.

Early life and career

Born in Barton Mills, Mildenhall, Suffolk, Balfe spent time in a children's home in Sheffield. He began working in a bakery in 1960 and joined USDAW. The following year, he moved to London and worked first for the Crown Agents for Overseas Governments, then at the Foreign Office, before studying at the London School of Economics.

In the 1970 general election, while a student, Balfe stood as the Labour Party candidate in Paddington South. He was unsuccessful, and instead became the Research Officer for the Finer Committee on One-Parent Families.

Political career 
At the 1973 Greater London Council election, Balfe was elected in Dulwich, serving until 1977. During this period, he was also political secretary of the Royal Arsenal Co-operative Society. 

He also served as Chair of Tottenham Conservative Association for five years, which he described as a "hopeless cause".

European Parliament 
At the first direct elections to the European Parliament in 1979, Balfe was elected as the Member of the European Parliament (MEP) for London South Inner. He held his seat until its abolition in 1999, then won a seat from fourth place on the party list for London. He supported a single European currency and was a member of the European Movement.

In late 2001, Balfe stood for election to the post of quaestor in the European Parliament, against instructions from his party group.  As a result, he was expelled in January 2002. In March, he joined the Conservative Party, the first elected Labour politician to do so since Reg Prentice in 1977.

Balfe stood down as an MEP in 2004. In 2008, he was appointed by David Cameron as the Conservatives' trade union envoy.

House of Lords 
On 19 September 2013 he was created a life peer taking the title Baron Balfe, of Dulwich in the London Borough of Southwark. Balfe served as President of the Cambridge Conservative Association, the Honorary President of the British Dietetic Association and a member of the Advisory Board at the UK-based 'Polar Regions' think-tank Polar Research and Policy Initiative. Currently, he is President of the TUC affiliated Union BALPA (the British Airline Pilots Association).

On 4 June 2015, Balfe proposed "a bill to make provision to allow European Union citizens who are resident in the United Kingdom to vote in parliamentary elections and to become members of Parliament; and for connected purposes".

In line with his pro-EU views, Balfe took an active role in "Cambridge For Europe", a local campaign which cites as its purpose ensuring "that people in Cambridge and its wider region fully understand the arguments for continued membership of the European Union". In addition to being a member of the group's steering committee, he is also a patron.

References

1944 births
Living people
Conservative Party (UK) life peers
Conservative Party (UK) MEPs
Labour Party (UK) MEPs
Labour Party (UK) councillors
Members of the Greater London Council
People from Forest Heath (district)
MEPs for England 1979–1984
MEPs for England 1984–1989
MEPs for England 1989–1994
MEPs for England 1994–1999
MEPs for England 1999–2004
Life peers created by Elizabeth II